Stronger Than Pride is the third studio album by English band Sade, released by Epic Records in the United Kingdom on 3 May 1988 and in the United States on 10 May 1988. In September 2018, Pitchfork placed the album at number 37 on its list of "The 200 Best Albums of the 1980s". The album spawned five singles.

Critical reception

Robert Christgau of The Village Voice stated, "I'm glad this self-made aristocrat has a human side, but I prefer her image: now that she's singing billets-doux, she's even further from rewarding the concentration she warrants than she used to be. Touching your beloved with a few true cliches is hard enough. For an audience you have to come up with something that doesn't fade into the background like the new age jazz she went pop with."

Kristine McKenna of the Los Angeles Times wrote, "The nine songs on Stronger Than Pride add up to one long plea of desire, and as the album makes its way up the charts—as it surely will—armies of love-struck men will no doubt dream of losing themselves in Sade's quiet storm of passion."

AllMusic's Ron Wynn commented that "Sade demonstrated some intensity and fire on her third release. Whether that was just an attempt to change the pace a bit or a genuine new direction, she had more animation in her delivery on such songs as 'Haunt Me,' 'Give It Up,' and the hit 'Paradise.' Not that she was suddenly singing in a soulful or bluesy manner; rather, Sade's dry and introspective tone now had a little more edge, and the lyrics were ironic as well as reflective. This was her third consecutive multi-platinum album, and it matched the two-million-plus sales level of her debut."

Track listing

Personnel
Credits adapted from the liner notes of Stronger Than Pride.

Sade
 Stuart Matthewman – guitars, saxophone
 Sade Adu – vocals
 Andrew Hale – keyboards
 Paul S. Denman – bass
 Sade – arrangements

Additional personnel
 Leroy Osbourne – vocals
 Martin Ditcham – drums, percussion
 James McMillan – trumpet
 Jake Jacas – trombone
 Gordon Hunte – guitar 
 Nick Ingman – string arrangements 
 Gavyn Wright – solo violin

Technical
 Sade – production
 Mike Pela – engineering, co-production
 Ben Rogan – engineering, co-production
 Melanie West – engineering assistance
 Vince McCartney – engineering assistance
 Franck Segarra – engineering assistance
 Olivier de Bosson – engineering assistance
 Alain Lubrano – engineering assistance
 Jean-Christophe Vareille – engineering assistance
 Herb Powers Jr. – mastering at Frankford/Wayne Mastering Labs (New York City)

Artwork
 Levon Parian – cover photograph
 Toshi Yajima – inner photograph
 Graham Smith – design

Charts

Weekly charts

Year-end charts

Certifications

See also
 List of European number-one hits of 1988

References

1988 albums
Epic Records albums
Sade (band) albums